Psammaecius is a genus of wasps belonging to the family Crabronidae.

The species of this genus are found in Europe and Northern America.

Species:
 Psammaecius austeni Turner, 1919 
 Psammaecius eremorum de Beaumont, 1952

References

Crabronidae
Hymenoptera genera